The year 2011 is the ninth year in the history of Jungle Fight, a mixed martial arts promotion based in Brazil. In 2011 Jungle Fight held 11 events beginning with, Jungle Fight 25.

Events list

Jungle Fight 25

Jungle Fight 25 was an event held on February 19, 2011 at President Joao Goulart Sports Gymnasium in Vila Velha, Brazil.

Results

Jungle Fight 26

Jungle Fight 26 was an event held on April 2, 2011 at Pacaembu Gymnasium in São Paulo, Brazil.

Results

Jungle Fight 27

Jungle Fight 27 was an event held on April 21, 2011 at Nilson Nelson Gymnasium in Brasília, Brazil.

Results

Jungle Fight 28

Jungle Fight 28 was an event held on May 21, 2011 at Flamengo Rowing Club Gymnasium in Rio de Janeiro, Brazil.

Results

Jungle Fight 29

Jungle Fight 29 was an event held on June 25, 2011 at Hércules Antônio Pereira Miranda Gymnasium in Serra, Brazil.

Results

Jungle Fight 30

Jungle Fight 30 was an event held on July 30, 2011 at Pará State University Gymnasium in Belém, Brazil.

Results

Jungle Fight 31

Jungle Fight 31 was an event held on August 20, 2011 at Prudente de Moraes Gymnasium in Itu, Brazil.

Results

Jungle Fight 32

Jungle Fight 32 was an event held on September 10, 2011 at Ibirapuera Gymnasium in Sao Paulo, Brazil.

Results

Jungle Fight 33

Jungle Fight 33 was an event held on October 21, 2011 at Cidade de Deus (Rio de Janeiro) in Rio de Janeiro, Brazil.

Results

Jungle Fight 34

Jungle Fight 34 was an event held on November 26, 2011 at Block of Mangueira in Rio de Janeiro, Brazil.

Results

Jungle Fight 35

Jungle Fight 35 was an event held on December 17, 2011 at Pacaembu Gymnasium in São Paulo, Brazil.

Results

References

Jungle Fight events
2011 in mixed martial arts